Paper for All or Paper4All is non-profit / charity organization registered in Burkina Faso, United Kingdom, France and the United States. Paper for All's main focus is to provide education and improve children's learning conditions, by supplying academic resources and tutoring, in one of the most illiterate countries in continental Africa, Burkina Faso, a country with a literacy rate of 24%, one of the lowest in the world.

Projects
Paper for All is committed in facilitating the education of the neediest children by providing them with better education conditions.

Distribution of Education Supplies
Distribute school supplies to schools with greatest number of primary pupils.

Paper 4 All is now distributing supplies and among these five are:
L'Ecole de la Cité de l'Avenir (670 pupils)
L'Ecole Yakaa (150 pupils)
Trame d'Accueil A (880 pupils)
Trame d'Accueil B (500 pupils)

Tutoring Program
Paper4All has put in place a tutoring programme, called Burkina School Monitor. The beneficiaries received a scholarship to pay for their academic fees.

Partners
Paper for All has worked and established partnerships or received support from a few select organizations.
The Herrod Foundation
The Iranian-Canadian Benevolent Foundation
Millennium Volunteers
ThinkSpotDesign
Junagarh Media
Clairefontaine - Rhodia
Air Liquide
Google Inc.
Deloitte & Touche
Community Services Volunteering
Lapdesk
Charity Car donation
Africa Guide

External links
Paper4All Website

References

Educational organisations based in Burkina Faso